László Ürögi (born 1940) is a Hungarian sprint canoeist who competed in the mid to late 1960s. He won two medals in the K-4 10000 m event at the ICF Canoe Sprint World Championships with a gold in 1963 and a silver in 1966.

References

Hungarian male canoeists
Living people
ICF Canoe Sprint World Championships medalists in kayak
1940 births
20th-century Hungarian people